Oscar Schwartau (born 17 May 2006) is a Danish professional footballer who plays for Brøndby. He has represented Denmark at youth levels.

Career

Brøndby
On 17 May 2022, Schwartau signed a three-year contract with Brøndby IF which tied him to the club until the summer 2025. He was officially promoted to the first team during 2022–23 pre-season and handed the #41 jersey.

2022–23 season
He made his professional debut on 17 July 2022 in the season opener of the Danish Superliga against AGF at the age of 16 years and 61 days. In doing so, he became the youngest player in club history and also became the first player born in 2006 to make an appearance in the Danish Superliga. On August 14 he scored his first goal in a 2–0 win against OB becoming the club's youngest league goalscorer, and second-youngest overall in Danish Superliga.

Career statistics

References

External links
 
 

2006 births
Living people
People from Høje-Taastrup Municipality
Sportspeople from the Capital Region of Denmark
Danish men's footballers
Denmark youth international footballers
Association football forwards
Danish Superliga players
Brøndby IF players